Tirumeeyachur Ilamkovil Sakalabhuvaneswarar Temple
(திருமீயச்சூர் இளங்கோயில் சகலபுவனேஸ்வரர் கோயில்)is a Hindu temple located at Thirumeeyachur in Tiruvarur district, Tamil Nadu, India. The presiding deity is Shiva. He is called as Sakalabhuvaneswarar. His consort is known as Mekalambika.

Significance 
It is one of the shrines of the 275 Paadal Petra Sthalams - Shiva Sthalams glorified in the early medieval Tevaram poems by Tamil Saivite Nayanar Tirunavukkarasar. This temple is in the premises of Tirumeeyachur Mehanadhar Temple.

Literary Mention 
Tirunavukkarasar describes the feature of the deity as:

References

External links 
 
 

Shiva temples in Tiruvarur district
Padal Petra Stalam